Eshelman was a marque of small American automobiles (1953–1961) and other vehicles and implements

Eshelman may also refer to:
Eshelman (surname)
Eshelman Motors Corporation
UNC Eshelman School of Pharmacy
Eshelman FW-5, a monoplane